"Missing You" is a song performed by American singer Diana Ross, taken from her 1984 album Swept Away, the song had been written, composed, and produced by Lionel Richie as a tribute to Marvin Gaye, who was murdered by his father earlier that year. The memorial song was released as the album's fourth single on November 13, 1984, by RCA. Richie also provided background vocals on the song.

Content and reception
The song was built during conversations about Gaye shared by Ross and Richie, who came up with a song shortly after the conversations. Released in late 1984, the song became Ross' last major hit on the U.S. pop singles chart, hitting the Top 10 in the spring of 1985. It was also her last song to reach number one on the R&B singles chart.

The video for the song was the first to be played on VH1, following a clip of "The Star-Spangled Banner" as performed by Marvin Gaye.

Its follow-up 45, "Telephone", was not promoted to Pop radio stations but reached the Top 20 of Billboard's Soul chart in the summer of 1985.

Chart history

Weekly charts

Year-end charts

References

External links
 

1980s ballads
1984 singles
1984 songs
Diana Ross songs
RCA Records singles
Commemoration songs
Songs about Marvin Gaye
Songs written by Lionel Richie
Song recordings produced by James Anthony Carmichael